This is a list of electoral division results for the 2016 Australian federal election in the state of Western Australia.

Overall results

Liberal to Labor: Burt, Cowan

Results by division

Brand

Burt

Burt was a new seat, notionally held by the Liberal party.

Canning

Cowan

Curtin

Durack

Forrest

Fremantle

Hasluck

Moore

O'Connor

Pearce

Perth

Stirling

Swan

Tangney

References

Western Australia 2016